Robert Hyde may refer to:

 Robert Hyde (died 1642) (c. 1562–1642), MP for Great Bedwyn and Chippenham
 Robert Hyde (1650–1722), MP for Hindon 1677–79, 1685–87, and 1689–98, and Wiltshire 1702–27 
 Robert Hyde (MP for Abingdon) (c. 1595 – at least 1638), MP for Abingdon 1621, Wootton Bassett 1625, and Cricklade 1626
 Robert Hyde (judge) (1595–1665), English judge
 Robert Hyde (footballer) (born 1954), Australian rules footballer
 Robert F. Hyde, American businessman, lobbyist, and political candidate
 Bob Hyde, a character in the 1978 film Coming Home

See also